Petra Cetkovská and Lucie Hradecká were the defending champions, but both players chose not to participate.

Nina Bratchikova and Darija Jurak won the title, defeating Johanna Larsson and Jasmin Wöhr in the final, 6–4, 6–2.

Seeds

Draw

External Links
 Draw

Open GDF Suez de Bretagne - Doubles
L'Open 35 de Saint-Malo